Diana Thomas (formerly David Thomas; born 17 January 1959), better known by the pen name Tom Cain, is an English journalist and author of a series of thriller novels about protagonist Samuel Carver.

Biography

Thomas' mother is the Liberal Democrat peer Baroness Thomas of Walliswood. Her father was a British diplomat, David Churchill Thomas.
For the first few years of her life, Thomas lived in Moscow and has also lived in Washington, D.C. and Havana, Cuba. She was educated at Eton College

She spent 25 years as a journalist, working for publications such as The Daily Mail and The Mail on Sunday. She was mocked in Private Eye for her frequent contribution to these newspapers, being satirised as "Daily Thomas of the David Mail". In 1989, she became the youngest ever editor of Punch magazine, a role she kept for three years.
in 1995, her comic novel Girl was published. In this, a man enters hospital for a minor surgery, but accidentally receives the sex reassignment surgery that was intended for another patient. Between 2007 and 2012, she wrote a well-received series of thrillers about a former Royal Marine, turned assassin, Samuel Carver.

In 2019, Thomas began writing a column in the Daily Telegraph - A New Woman - about transitioning to become a woman, Diana Thomas. Julie Bindel, the feminist activist and writer, has criticised the column, pointing out that Thomas was previously a men's rights activist. Bindel described Thomas's 1992 book Not Guilty: The Case in Defence of Men, as "a rant about how feminists have the brass neck to blame men for the terrible things they do to women, rather than themselves." Bindel concludes of Thomas's views on women: "While feminists fight for the right for women to break free of oppressive sex stereotypes, the likes of Thomas claim them for [herself]." The column ended on 19 December 2020, with Thomas bidding an emotional farewell to her readers as she reflected on her harrowing transgender journey.

As Diana Thomas, she has written in her defence that transitioning could be considered analogous to immigration: ‘If someone born in India comes to Britain legally, passes the citizenship test and gets a UK passport, who dares say, “You’re not British”? Only a racist. Well, as far as the law goes, when I get a Gender Recognition Certificate, I’ll be a woman, just as that immigrant is British and denying that fact would be no better than racial prejudice.'

Her writing influences include Lee Child, Ian Fleming, and George Macdonald Fraser.

Books
1993 Not guilty : men, the case for the defence
1995 Girl

Samuel Carver series
2007 The Accident Man
2008 TheSamuel Carver Survivor (US title: No Survivors)
2009 Assassin
2010 Dictator
2011 Carver
2012 Revenger

References

External links
 

1959 births
Living people
People educated at Eton College
Alumni of King's College, Cambridge
Punch (magazine) people
Daily Mail journalists
21st-century British novelists
English thriller writers
Transgender women
Transgender writers
English LGBT writers